Kapenguria is a town lying north east of Kitale on the A1 road in Kenya. Kapenguria is capital of the West Pokot County. Kapenguria forms a municipality with an urban population of 13,000 and a total population of 56,000 (1999 census).

Kapenguria municipality has seven wards (Chemwochoi, Kaibos, Kapenguria, Keringet/Psigirio, Kisiaunet, Siyoi and Talau). All of them belong to Kapenguria Constituency, which has a total of 23 wards, the remaining 15 are located within other local authorities.

Lying near the Saiwa Swamp National Park, Kapenguria is home to the Kapenguria museum in the prison where Jomo Kenyatta was incarcerated in 1953 for his alleged role in the Mau Mau Rebellion.

It is the home of Tegla Loroupe, world-record-holder in the marathon, half-marathon, 20,000-metre, 15,000-metre and 10,000-metre races. She holds annual Peace Race races here, to bring peace among the eight tribes in the West Pokot area.

This is the location of the Tegla Loroupe Peace Academy, founded to provide education for orphans from the tribal wars.

See also 
Kapenguria Six

References 

Populated places in West Pokot County
County capitals in Kenya